The Residential Tenancies Authority (RTA) is a self funded statutory authority providing targeted and dedicated services to meet the diverse needs of the residential rental sector of Queensland, Australia. The RTA is available to assist all Queensland tenants, residents, lessors, property managers, caravan park managers and residential providers.

The RTA was previously known as the Rental Bond Authority and was established in 1989.  In 1994, the name was changed and the role of the organisation was expanded.  The core responsibility of the RTA is to administer the Residential Tenancies and Rooming Accommodation Act 2008 (the Act) legislation. The RTA's main office is located at 179 Turbot Street in the Brisbane central business district.

The Act establishes the rights and responsibilities of parties to a residential tenancy. It applies to different types of accommodation including rental houses, flats, caravans, moveable dwellings and rooming style accommodation.

Role of the RTA
The role of the RTA is to provide:
 tenancy information
 rental bond management
 dispute resolution
 community education 
 industry research and data
 investigation and prosecution of offences under the Act
 monitoring and review of legislation

Governance of the RTA
As a statutory authority, the RTA is governed by a Board of Directors with knowledge and experience relevant to the Queensland residential rental sector. The chairperson and the six directors are appointed by the Governor-in-Council (i.e., the Governor acting on the advice of the State's Executive Council) for three year terms.

The RTA is part of the portfolio of the Minister for Housing and Public Works.

See also

 Government of Queensland

References

External links
Official Website
Residential Tenancies and Rooming Accommodation Act 2008

Government agencies of Queensland
1989 establishments in Australia
Government agencies established in 1989
Renting